Piz Denter is a mountain of the Lepontine Alps, located on the border between the Swiss cantons of Graubünden and Ticino. On its northern side (Graubünden), it overlooks the valleys of Lake Curnera and Lake Nalps, both drained by tributaries of the Rhine.

References

External links
Piz Denter on Hikr

Mountains of the Alps
Mountains of Switzerland
Mountains of Graubünden
Mountains of Ticino
Two-thousanders of Switzerland
Tujetsch